Elizabeth Heaston Thompson (born 1977) is an American athlete who is the first woman ever to score in a college football game. She accomplished this feat on October 18, 1997 as a placekicker for the Willamette Bearcats football team of Willamette University, which then competed in the National Association of Intercollegiate Athletics (NAIA) for small colleges. She also played women's soccer for Willamette as a defender. Heaston's accomplishment was widely noted by the media and the sports community.

Life
Heaston was raised in Richland, Washington. After graduating she enrolled at Willamette University, where she became a star soccer player, earning All-American honorable mention in 1996 and 1997. In 1997 she joined the football team as a backup placekicker. She became the first woman to play and score points in a college football game during a match between Willamette and Linfield College on October 18, 1997. The 5-foot-5-inch, 120-pound soccer player entered the game as a replacement kicker for Willamette and kicked two extra points as her team won 27-0.  The accomplishment resulted in interviews with The Today Show and CBS This Morning.

Heaston's football career lasted two games; she made two of four extra point attempts.  Her jersey hangs on display at the College Football Hall of Fame.

The following year Heaston played only soccer at Willamette, and graduated with a biology degree in 1999. She attended graduate school at Pacific University where she earned a doctorate in optometry and met her husband Trent Thompson. She has one daughter, Isabella, and a son and lives and works in her hometown of Richland, Washington, where she works at her father's optometry office along with her husband.

See also
 1997 Linfield vs. Willamette football game
 Tonya Butler, the first female to score a field goal in an NCAA game
 Sarah Fuller, the first woman to score in a Power Five conferences football game
 Katie Hnida, the first woman to score in a Division I-A game
 Ashley Martin, the first female to score in an NCAA game, and the first to score in a Division I game
 List of female American football players

References

1977 births
Living people
American football placekickers
American women's soccer players
Women's association football defenders
Female players of American football
People from Richland, Washington
Pacific University alumni
Willamette Bearcats football players
21st-century American women
Willamette Bearcats women's soccer players